Switzerland women's national floorball team is the national team of Switzerland. At the 1997 Women's World Floorball Championships in Godby and Mariehamn, Åland Islands, Finland, the team finished fourth. At the 1999 WCS in Borlänge, Sweden, the team finished second in the A-Division. At the 2001 WCS in Riga, Latvia, the team finished fourth in the A-Division. At the 2003 WCS in Germany, the team finished second in the A-Division. At the 2005 WCS in Singapore, the team became world champions for the first time. At the 2007 WCS in Frederikshavn, Denmark, the team finished second in the A-Division. In the tournaments from 2009 to 2019, the team has finished 2nd, 4th, 3rd, 3rd, 3rd and 2nd respectively.

References 

Women's national floorball teams
Floorball
Floorball in Switzerland
Swiss floorball teams